Parectopa undosa is a moth of the family Gracillariidae. It is known from Haiti and the Virgin Islands (Saint Thomas).

References

Gracillariinae